Romulea cruciata is a herbaceous perennial in the family Iridaceae. It is endemic to the Cape Province in South Africa.

References

Endemic flora of South Africa
cruciata